The 2022–23 Indigo Group Premiership is the 4th season of the new format of the rugby union competition Welsh Premier Division. It began on 3 September 2022. For sponsorship reasons, it is known as Indigo Group Premiership.

Structure 
The structure reverts back to its traditional league format following truncation the previous season. Each team will play each other team on a home and away basis for a total of 22 games. League points are awarded as such – 4 points for a win, 2 for a draw and 0 for a loss. Teams can also earn an additional bonus point by scoring four or more tries in a match and/or losing by less than seven points. The structure will see the top 4 teams compete in an end of season playoff format, with the final taking place at the ground of the highest seed and winning team being declared champions. There will be no relegation this season following an expansion from 12 to 14 teams for the 2023–24 season.

Teams

Indigo Group Premiership

Standings

Fixtures & results

Week 1

Week 2
All matches on September 10 postponed due to the death of Queen Elizabeth II.

Week 3

Week 4

Week 5

Week 6

Week 7

Week 8

Week 9

Week 10
Numerous matches postponed due to weather

Week 11
Numerous matches postponed due to weather

Week 12

Week 13

Week 14

Week 15

Week 16

Week 17

Week 18

Week 19

Week 20

Week 21

Week 22

References

External links 
 
 Indigo Premiership fixtures and results

Welsh Premier Division seasons
Premiership
Wales